Ross Seymour (born 22 December 1953) is an Australian former swimmer. He competed in two events at the 1976 Summer Olympics.

References

External links
 

1953 births
Living people
Australian male butterfly swimmers
Olympic swimmers of Australia
Swimmers at the 1976 Summer Olympics
Place of birth missing (living people)
Commonwealth Games medallists in swimming
Commonwealth Games silver medallists for Australia
Swimmers at the 1974 British Commonwealth Games
Medallists at the 1974 British Commonwealth Games